Kabeiro phasmida is a species of sea slug, a dendronotid nudibranch, a marine gastropod mollusc in the family Dotidae.

Distribution
This species was described from Mainit Point, Calumpan Peninsula, Batangas Province, Luzon, Philippines. It has been photographed in Indonesia.

Description
The body of this dendronotid nudibranch is light brown. The cerata are irregular in shape and there are raised tubercles on the sides of the body. The maximum length of this species is 20 mm.

EcologyKabeiro phasmida'' is found on colonies of a pinnate hydroid.

References

External links
 

Dotidae
Gastropods described in 2015